A moving magnet actuator is a type of electromagnetic linear actuator. It typically consists of an arrangement of a mobile permanent magnet and fixed coil, arranged so that currents in the coil generate a pair of equal and opposite forces between the coil and magnet. 

A voice coil actuator, also called a voice coil motor (VCM), is an electromagnetic linear actuator where the magnet is fixed and the coil is mobile. In this configuration the coil is common called a voice coil.

See also 
 Tubular linear motor

References 

Actuators